Prenolepis imparis, commonly known as the winter ant, false honey ant, or false honeypot ant, is a species of ant in the genus Prenolepis. The species is found in North America, from Canada to Mexico, nesting deep within the ground. Unusual among ants, Prenolepis imparis prefers lower temperatures, including near freezing, and is only active outside the nest during winter and early spring. Prenolepis imparis enters a hibernation-like state called aestivation during the summer.

P. imparis secretes an opaque white liquid from its abdomen as a defense against other ants, including Linepithema humile. The defensive secretions appear to be derived anatomically from the Dufour's gland and has been shown to contain a mixture of alkanes and alkenes including hexadecene, octadecene, tetradecene, octylcyclohexane, and hexadecane. Secretions from P. imparis have experimentally been shown to often kill L. humile workers.

Subspecies
Prenolepis imparis arizonica Wheeler., 1930
Prenolepis imparis colimana Wheeler, 1930
Prenolepis imparis coloradensis Wheeler, 1930
Prenolepis imparis veracruzensis Wheeler, 1930

References

External links

AntWiki has information on the identification, distribution, and biology of Prenolepis imparis.

Formicinae
Hymenoptera of North America
Insects described in 1836